SkyCity (originally known as the Eye of the Needle) was a revolving restaurant and bar situated atop the Space Needle in Seattle, Washington, United States.

Description and history 
The restaurant featured a  carousel (or ring-shaped) dining floor on which sat patrons' tables, chairs, and dining booths. Its floor revolved on a track and wheel system weighing roughly 125 tons, moving at a rate of one revolution every 47 minutes. It was the oldest operating revolving restaurant in the world at the time of its closure.  Due to the balance and precision of its design, the floor's rotation is accomplished using just a single 1½-horsepower motor.

The restaurant was designed by John Graham & Company and styled after the La Ronde they had built atop the Ala Moana Center in 1963. SkyCity was a fine dining restaurant with a casual dress code and served Pacific Northwest cuisine and new American cuisine, providing local seafood, steak, chicken and vegetarian items among others. 

The restaurant was closed in September 2017 for the $100 million "The Century Project" renovation at the Space Needle, with plans for the dining area to be outfitted with a clear glass floor. The glass floor would enable diners to view the city below them and also the mechanics that operate the revolving floor. When completed, SkyCity was to have the world's first revolving restaurant with a glass floor. It was replaced with the Loupe Lounge, a cocktail lounge that opened in the restaurant's former space on April 9, 2021.

In popular culture
The Scooby-Doo, Where Are You? episode "A Frightened Hound Meets Demons Underground", aired in 1976 as episode 10 of the first season, is set in Seattle and features the gang at SkyCity as they discuss a newspaper article about a demon who has been terrorizing the city's residents. The gang is seen at the restaurant again at the end of the episode.

See also
 List of defunct restaurants of the United States
 List of New American restaurants
 List of Pacific Northwest restaurants

References

Towers with revolving restaurants
Seattle Center
Defunct restaurants in Seattle
Defunct New American restaurants
Defunct Pacific Northwest restaurants
2017 disestablishments in Washington (state)
Restaurants disestablished in 2017
New American restaurants in Seattle